Paul (Palle) Wagnberg (born 25 April 1961 in Norrköping, Sweden) is a Swedish–Norwegian jazz musician, mostly known for his jazz-organ playing. He also sings and plays the piano in addition to composing.

Career 
Wagnberg was born in Norrköping, Sweden.  Since 1985 he has been playing professionally with his Hammond B3 organ. He is in particular known for his footwork on the bass pedals.

He is known for his collaborations within the Swedish-Norwegian jazz quartet The Real Thing, comprising Wagnberg (Hammond B3 organ), Staffan William-Olsson (guitar), Børre Dalhaug (drums) and the late Sigurd Køhn (saxophone). The Real Thing is currently put on hold after Køhn died in 2004 in Thailand by the tsunami catastrophe.

With his own trio Wagnberg has released three albums, Eat Meat (1999) with Torstein Ellingsen (drums) and Randy Johnston (guitar), Gone Fishing (2001) with Torstein Ellingsen (drums) and Frode Kjekstad (guitar) and Catch 22 (2007) with Erik 
In 2009 he contributed organ on Stina Stenerud's album Kissing Fools with Hildegunn Øiseth on trumpet.
Apart from his own "Organ Unit", Wagnberg is organist in the tribute band "Santana The Experience" from Stockholm.

Discography

Solo albums 
Paul Wagnberg Trio
1999: Eat Meat (Real Music Records)
2001: Gone Fishing (Real Music Records)

Paul Wagnberg Organ Unit
2007: Catch 22 (Real Music Records)

Collaborative works 
Within The Real Thing
1992: The Real Thing (Real Music Records)
1993: ...in New York (Real Music Records), feat. Lew Soloff produced by Georg "Jojje" Wadenius, and nominated for the Spellemannprisen 1994
1994: A Perfect Match  (Real Music Records), with Bohuslän Big Band, arranged and produced by the Los Angeles-based arranger Tom Kubis
1995: Live (Real Music Records)
1997: Pleasure is an Attitude (Real Music Records)
2000: Deluxe (Real Music Records), with Even Kruse Skatrud and the Norwegian Radio Orchestra
2003: New Wrapping (Real Music Records)
2006: A Real Christmas (Real Music Records), feat. Sigrid Brennhaug on vocal

With J.T. Lauritsen & The Buckshot Hunters
1995: Buckshot Hunters (Hunters Records)
1999: My Kind of Blues (Hunters Records)
2001: Make A Better World(Hunters Records)
2004: Perfect Moves (Hunters Records)

Within Børre Dalhaug's "Bigbandblast»
2004: Bigbandblast! (Real Records)

With Stina Stenerud
2009: Kissing Fools (Hunter Records)

References

External links 

Swedish jazz musicians
Jazz organists
Spellemannprisen winners
People from Norrköping
1961 births
Living people
21st-century organists
The Real Thing (Norwegian band) members